Round Mountain, a mountain of the Snowy Range, a spur of the Great Dividing Range, is located on the Northern Tablelands in the New England region in New South Wales, Australia.

Description

The northern slopes of Round Mountain are drained by the Guy Fawkes River which flows over the Ebor Falls and eventually goes into the Clarence River. The south slopes of Round Mountain are drained by the Styx River which flows to the Macleay River and the Oaky River which drains into the Chandler River.

A radar air navigation station, for the control and guidance of aircraft, is located on the summit of Round Mountain.

See also

 List of mountains of New South Wales

References

Mountains of New South Wales
Northern Tablelands
New England (New South Wales)